Kumbhargaon is a village in the Patan taluka of Satara district in Maharashtra state, India.

Demographics
Covering  and comprising 394 households at the time of the 2011 census of India, Kumbhargaon had a population of 1808. There were 913 males and 895 females, with 222 people being aged six or younger.

References

Villages in Karmala taluka